This is a timeline of the history of the city of Auckland in New Zealand.

19th century

 1840 – Auckland founded.
 1841
 St Paul's founded, Auckland's first church.
 Mr Powell's School founded, Auckland's first school.
 1842
 Auckland designated capital of New Zealand.
 Immigrant ships Duchess of Argyle and Jane Gifford arrive from Greenock, Scotland.
 Mechanics' Institute and Library opens.
 Population: 2,895.
 1843
 Southern Cross newspaper begins publication.
 Queen Street gravelled.
 Auckland Domain laid out.
 1844 – May: Maori Festival held.
 1847 – First fencible settlers arrive.
 1848 – St Patrick's Cathedral built.
 1849 – St Barnabas Church built, Auckland's first Māori church.
 1850 – St Andrew's Church built.
 1855 – Auckland Choral Society founded.
 1857 – St Peter's School established.
 1860 – Old St Mary's built.
 1861
 Population: 7,989.
 Great South Road commenced.
 1863 – The New Zealand Herald begins publication.
 1864 – Population: 12,423.
 1865
 New Zealand capital relocated from Auckland to Wellington.
 Original St Sepulchre's built.
 1868 – Auckland Institute incorporated.
 1869 – First Royal Tour – the Prince Alfred, the Duke of Edinburgh. 
 1870 – Evening Star newspaper begins publication.
 1871
 Auckland City Council established.
 Philip Philips becomes first mayor.
 Auckland Harbour Board established.
 1873
 Onehunga Branch railway begins operating.
 New City Markets opens.
 1874 – Ellerslie Racecourse laid out.
 1880 Church of the Holy Sepulchre founded.
 1881
 Population: 16,664.
 Auckland Teachers' Training College established.
 1883 – Auckland University College founded.
 1884 – Horse-drawn trams begin operating.
 1885 – Newmarket becomes a borough.
 1885 – Old St Paul's Church demolished.
 1886
 Population: 33,161. 
 Devonport becomes a borough.
 1887
 Public Library opens.
 Auckland Sailors' Home built.
 1888
 St Mary's Cathedral built.
 Art Gallery opens.
 Birkenhead, New Zealand becomes a borough.
 1890 – Elam School of Fine Arts founded.
 1894 – Current St Paul's Church dedicated.
 1895 – Auckland Technical School founded.
 1896 – 13 October: First motion pictures screened in New Zealand shown at the Wellesley Street Opera House as part of Charles Godfrey’s Vaudeville.
 1898 – Old Colonists' Association meetings begin.
 1899 – Great Barrier Island–Auckland pigeon post begins operating.

20th century

 1901 – Grand Hotel Fire.
 1901 – Royal Tour – The Duke & Duchess of Cornwall. The Mayor, Dr John Logan Campbell donates Cornwall Park to the city.
 1902 – Electric tram system installed.
 1905 – Victoria Park opens.
 1906 – Mount Eden becomes a borough
 1908 – St Patrick's Cathedral dedicated. North Island Main Trunk railway opened. Northcote becomes a borough.
 1909 – Auckland Girl's Grammar School moves to Howe Street, Freeman's Bay.
 1910 – Grafton Bridge and Kings Theatre built.
 1911 – Mount Albert becomes a borough
 Auckland Town Hall built.
 Population: 40,536.
 1912 – Auckland Ferry Terminal built. Otahuhu becomes a borough
 1913 – 1913 Great Strike. Takapuna becomes a borough. Municipal Coal fired Electricity Power Station on King's Wharf completed and opened February. Auckland Industrial Exhibition held in Auckland Domain over summer 1913/1914.
 1914 – Start of World War I
 1915 – Auckland Presbyterian College for Ladies established in Epsom
 1915 – Myers Park opened.
 1916 – Myers Free Kindergarten building opened. Auckland grammar School moves to Mt Eden.
 Old Colonists' Museum opens.
 Population: 64,951.
 1917 – Mount Eden Prison completed
 1918 – End of World War I
 1920 – Auckland City Mission established.
 1920 – Royal Tour – the Prince Edward, Prince of Wales.
 1921 – Population: 83,467.
 1922 – Auckland Zoo opens.
 1923 – Underground railway proposed.
 1925 – North Auckland Line opened
 1925 – Royal Tour – The Duke & Duchess of York.
 1927 – Dilworth Building constructed.
 1927 – Underground Railway project announced.
 1928 – St. James Theatre opens.
 1929 – Auckland Civic Theatre and Auckland War Memorial Museum inaugurated.
 1930
 Auckland Railway Station opens. One Tree Hill becomes a borough
 Eastern Line railway begins operating.
 1932 – Unemployed riot on Queen Street.
 1938 – Royal Tour, the Duke & Duchess of Gloucester.
 1939 – St Peter's College established in Grafton. World War II started.
 1944 – New Central Fire Station opened.
 1945 – World War II ended
 1947 – Mount Roskill becomes a borough
 1949 – First trolley bus services ran
 1950 – February: 1950 British Empire Games held.
 1951 – 1951 New Zealand waterfront dispute
 1952 – Mount Wellington becomes a borough. First section of Northwestern Motorway opened
 1953 – First royal visit by a monarch – Queen Elizabeth II – Xmas broadcast from Government House Auckland.
 1953 – First section of Auckland Southern Motorway opened from Ellerslie-Panmure highway to Mount Wellington Highway. Hunua dams completed
 1954 – East Coast Bays becomes a borough
 1955 – Auckland Southern Motorway opened to Wiri
 1956 – Last tram ran in Auckland
 1959 – Auckland Harbour Bridge built. First section of Auckland Northern Motorway opened
 1960 – Mangere sewage treatment plant opened
 1961 – Alcan Industries aluminum plant and Vibrapac concrete block plant both established at Wiri
 1962 – Victoria Park Viaduct opens. Nestleinstant coffee factory opened in South Auckland
 1963 – Auckland Southern Motorway opened to Takanini
 1964 – Auckland Regional Authority founded. The Beatles played a concert at Auckland
 1965 – Manurewa Borough amalgamated with Manukau County to form Manukau City. Fibremakers nylon yarn factory opened in South Auckland
 1966 – Auckland Airport and Newmarket Viaduct open.
 1967
 Auckland Observatory founded.
 Mount Smart Stadium opens in Penrose.
 1968 – Auckland InterContinental hotel opened. Paremoremo Prison opened.
 1969 – Auckland Rapid Rail Transit proposed
 1970 – Auckland Opera founded.
 1971 – Sister city relationship established with Los Angeles, USA.
 1972 – Air New Zealand House (now HSBC Building) opened. Dalgety's wool store (the largest in the Southern Hemisphere) opened in South Auckland
 1973 – Ford car assembly plant opened in Wiri
 1974 – National Mutual (now Axa) West Plaza opened. First Manukau City Centre building, the Wiri Trust Hotel opened
 1976 – Auckland Rapid Rail Transit proposal abandoned. Manukau City Centre Mall's first stage opened. NZ Labour Department office opened in Manukau City Centre
 1977 – Manukau City Council administration building opened
 1979 – Housing New Zealand building opened at Manukau City Centre
 1980 – Auckland Philharmonia Orchestra formed. Last trolley bus ran
 1982 – Rainbows End theme park opened
 1983
 New Mangere Bridge built. First section of Southwestern Motorway opened.
 Catherine Tizard becomes first woman mayor of Auckland.
 1986 – Manukau Court building opened
 1987 – Newstalk ZB radio begins.
 1989 – Auckland local bodies amalgamated to form Auckland City, North Shore City, Waitakere City, Manukau City Cities and Papakura District, Rodney District and Franklin District. Auckland Regional Authority renamed Auckland Regional Council
 1990
 January–February: 1990 Commonwealth Games held.
 Aotea Centre opens.
 1991
 Starship Children's Health opens.
 Renaissance Centre built in Manukau.
 ANZ Centre completed.
 1993 – 26 November: Two aircraft being operated for the police collided over central Auckland.
 1996 – Skycity Auckland casino opens.
 1997 – Sky Tower built.
 1998
 February–March: Electrical power crisis.
 Cycle Action Auckland founded.
 1999 – Metropolis apartment building completed.
 2000
 Auckland Institute of Technology becomes Auckland University of Technology.
 Vero Centre office tower completed.
 Yachting's America's Cup contested.

21st century

 2003
 Britomart Transport Centre opens.
 New main Auckland City Hospital building completed.
 Yachting's America's Cup contested in Auckland for the second time.
 2004
 Northwestern Cycleway laid out.
 Auckland Regional Transport Authority established.
 2006 – 12 June: Electrical blackout for half of Auckland.
 2010
 Auckland Council established for Auckland Region.
 New stands completed at Eden Park, expanding permanent capacity to 50,000.
 Population: 1,486,000.
 2011: Several matches of the 2011 Rugby World Cup, including the final, held at Eden Park. 
 2012
 Jacobs Ladder Bridge for pedestrians at Saint Marys Bay opens.
 Victoria Park Tunnel built.
 2014 – Electric train services commence.
 2019 - The Skycity Convention Centre catches fire on 22 October while still under construction, causing significant disruption in the CBD.
 2023 - 2023 Auckland floods: Torrential rain causes widespread flooding, evacuations and damage across Auckland and four deaths.

See also
 History of Auckland
 Mayor of Auckland City (1871–2010)
 Timeline of New Zealand history

References

Bibliography

Published in the 19th century
 
 
 
 
 
 

Published in the 20th century

External links

 
 

 
Auckland
Auckland
Years in New Zealand